Notodromas is a genus of ostracods belonging to the family Notodromadidae.

The species of this genus are found in Europe and Northern America.

Species:
 Notodromas monacha (Müller, 1776) 
 Notodromas persica Gurney, 1921

References

Podocopida
Podocopida genera